Joseph C. Roberts (May 18, 1936 – October 10, 2022) was an American professional basketball player who played three seasons in the National Basketball Association (NBA) and one season in the American Basketball Association (ABA).  He played for the Syracuse Nationals and Kentucky Colonels from 1960 to 1968, having earlier played for Ohio State University's 1960 NCAA champions.  After retiring from playing, he served as assistant coach of the Golden State Warriors and Los Angeles Clippers.

Early life
Roberts was born in Columbus, Ohio, on May 18, 1936.  He attended East High School in his hometown.  He then studied biological studies and physical education at Ohio State University, where he played for the Ohio State Buckeyes from 1957 to 1960.  He was a senior co-captain of the 1960 team – which included  Jerry Lucas, John Havlicek, Mel Nowell, Bob Knight, and Gary Gearhart – that lost only three games en route to the 1960 NCAA title.  Roberts was selected in the third round of the 1960 NBA draft by the Syracuse Nationals.

Playing career
Roberts made his NBA debut on October 22, 1960, scoring six points to go along with three rebounds against the Philadelphia Warriors.  He led the league in games played (80) the following year.  He ultimately played three seasons with the Nationals, during which time there was an unspoken rule that restricted teams to three African American players.  The franchise qualified for the NBA playoffs in each of those years, but lost to the Boston Celtics, Warriors, and Cincinnati Royals, respectively.

Roberts returned to his hometown of Columbus, Ohio for the 1966–67 season as the player/manager for the Columbus Comets of the newly-formed and short-lived North American Basketball League (NABL).  There, he played with former East High and Ohio State teammate Mel Nowell as well as former Ohio State alumni Dick Reasbeck, Gary Bradds, and Jim Doughty.  Roberts did return to play for the Kentucky Colonels of the ABA for one season in 1967, the ABA's first year.

Coaching career
After his playing career ended, Roberts became an assistant coach for Western Michigan in the Mid-American Conference, then Iowa in the Big Ten, before being an assistant for the NBA's Golden State Warriors and coach Al Attles for five years.  The Warriors, led by MVP Rick Barry, won the NBA championship in 1975.  Roberts coached the Warriors to their fourth win in the NBA finals against the Washington Bullets after Attles was ejected from the game.

Personal life and death
Roberts was married to Celia for 65 years until his death. Together, they had three children.

Roberts died on the morning of October 10, 2022, at his home in Oakland, California. He was 86, and suffered from cancer prior to his death.

References

External links 

1936 births
2022 deaths
African-American basketball players
Allentown Jets players
American men's basketball players
Basketball players from Columbus, Ohio
Golden State Warriors assistant coaches
Kentucky Colonels players
Ohio State Buckeyes men's basketball players
Power forwards (basketball)
Sportspeople from Columbus, Ohio
Syracuse Nationals draft picks
Syracuse Nationals players
21st-century African-American people
20th-century African-American sportspeople